Paluan is a language spoken by the Murut people of Borneo. The principal dialects are Paluan (Peluan) itself and Pandewan.

References

Murutic languages
Endangered Austronesian languages
Languages of Malaysia